Juan Ibáñez (April 20, 1938 – September 12, 2000) was a Mexican actor, film director, producer and writer. He was born in Guanajuato, Guanajuato and died in Mexico City.

Works
Un alma pura, (1965) writer, director
Los caifanes (a.k.a. The Outsiders) (1967) writer, director
Fear Chamber (1968) co-director
House of Evil (1968) co-director
The Adolescents (1968) writer
The Incredible Invasion (a.k.a. Alien Terror) (1971) co-director
La generala (1971) writer, director
Isle of the Snake People (1971) writer, co-director (as Jhon Ibanez)
Divinas palabras (1978) writer, director
A fuego lento (1980) writer, director
Olimpica, (1975(?) theater director

External links

Juan Ibáñez at Directores del cine mexicano

1938 births
2000 deaths
Mexican film directors